Eve Southern (born Elva L. McDowell; August 23, 1900 – November 29, 1972) was an American film actress. She appeared in 38 films from 1916 to 1936. In 1930 she was selected by portrait artist Rolf Armstrong as one of the film industry's 16 "screen beauties".

Early years
Southern studied music in Fort Worth, with her voice covering three octaves, "the lowest tones of the contralto as well as the high C of the soprano." She also was interested in acting in films, however.

Career
Southern moved from Fort Worth to Hollywood and began working in films when she was 13 years old, but many of her parts were removed in editing.

After appearing in several films in the late 1910s and early 1920s, Southern suffered an automobile accident in June 1929 that left her badly injured. It was reported in July that year that she had "been in a plaster cast for weeks." In 1932, she broke her back, after which she appeared in several roles before retiring from film.

Death
Southern died in Santa Monica, California, on November 29, 1972, after a battle with Parkinson's disease. She is interred at Valhalla Memorial Park Cemetery in North Hollywood, California.

Selected filmography
Intolerance (1916)
Conscience (1917)
Broadway Love (1918)
Greater Than Love (1921)
After the Show (1921)
 The Rage of Paris (1921)
The Golden Gallows (1922)
Nice People (1922)
 The Girl in His Room (1922)
Souls for Sale (1923)
 Burning Words (1923)
Trimmed in Scarlet (1923)
 The Chorus Lady (1924)
The Dangerous Blonde (1924)
Morals for Men (1925)
A Woman of the Sea (1926)
With Love and Hisses (1927)
Wild Geese (1927)
The Gaucho (1927)
Clothes Make the Woman (1928)
 The Naughty Duchess (1928)
 Stormy Waters (1928)
The Haunted House (1928)
 Whispering Winds (1929)
Morocco (1930)
Lilies of the Field (1930)
Fighting Caravans (1931)
Law of the Sea (1932)
The Ghost Walks (1934)
Stage Frights (1935)
The King Steps Out (1936)

Further reading

References

Works cited

External links

1900 births
1972 deaths
Actresses from Texas
American film actresses
American silent film actresses
People from Ranger, Texas
20th-century American actresses
Deaths from Parkinson's disease
Neurological disease deaths in California